James Gorman Thomas III (born December 12, 1950) is an American former professional baseball player. He played Major League Baseball (MLB) as a center fielder and right-handed hitter. Thomas played in the American League (AL) with the Milwaukee Brewers (1973–76, 1978–83, 1986), Cleveland Indians (1983) and Seattle Mariners (1984–86).

With the Brewers, Thomas was one of the franchise's most popular players. He was a leading home run hitter in the late 1970s and early 1980s, though he hit for a low batting average and frequently struck out. Thomas had good fielding skills and his throwing arm was strong until shoulder surgery in 1984, after which he became a designated hitter until his retirement in 1986.

Early life
Thomas was born in Charleston, South Carolina. His father, Gorman Sr, was a postal worker and a former minor league pitcher. Thomas was raised in nearby James Island. His family moved to Columbia, South Carolina where he attended Cardinal Newman High School through his junior year, playing on a State Championship Basketball team in 1968. He attended James Island High School his senior year. In high school, Thomas earned 14 letters in four sports - baseball, football, basketball and track. He was the first draft pick of the Seattle Pilots in 1969.

Career

Milwaukee Brewers
In 1971, Thomas played Class A baseball in the Milwaukee system, with the Danville Warriors that year, Thomas led the Midwest League in both home runs and strikeouts. The next year with the Class AA San Antonio Brewers, Thomas led the Texas League in the same two categories, registering 26 home runs versus 171 strikeouts.

Thomas spent parts of 1973 and 1974 in the major leagues with the Brewers, but he mostly played Class AAA baseball during those seasons. With the Sacramento Solons of the Pacific Coast League in 1974, Thomas finished second in the league in home runs (51), third in RBI (122), fourth in walks (93), third in runs scored (117) and first in strikeouts (175). He spent most of the next two years on the bench with the Brewers, but he enjoyed being teammates with Hank Aaron during Aaron's last two MLB seasons.

Thomas played in Class AAA for the entire 1977 season. After the season, Thomas was traded to the Texas Rangers as the player to be named later in an earlier trade for Ed Kirkpatrick. Rangers executive Dan O'Brien Sr. explained the move as a temporary "friendship deal". Brewers general manager Harry Dalton needed to open up a roster spot over the winter, and he asked O'Brien to hold Thomas on the Texas roster for a few months. In February 1978, O'Brien sold Thomas back to Milwaukee before he appeared in any games with the Rangers.

Becoming an everyday center fielder for the Brewers in 1978, Thomas hit 32 home runs to go along with 86 RBI. In 1979, Thomas enjoyed his best MLB season, compiling career high numbers in home runs (45, first in the AL), RBI (123), runs scored (97), hits (136), doubles (29), walks (98), on-base percentage (.356), total bases (300), slugging percentage (.539) and OPS (.895). He finished seventh in MVP Award voting. Thomas was affectionately known as "Stormin' Gorman."

In 1980, Thomas had another productive season, hitting 38 home runs to go along with 105 RBI, while playing in every game. Gorman followed that up in 1981 by finishing second in the AL in home runs with 21 and being named to the AL All-Star Team. He finished eighth in MVP Award voting that year. In 1982, Thomas hit an AL-high 39 home runs (tying with Reggie Jackson for the league lead) and drove in 112 runs to help the Brewers win the American League East. The Brewers went on to win the ALCS and face the Cardinals in the World Series, where they lost to the Cardinals in seven games, with Thomas striking out against Bruce Sutter to end the Series.

While with the Brewers, Thomas opened a bar in Milwaukee with pitcher Pete Vuckovich.  It was called "Stormin' & Vuke's", a play on their nicknames.

Trade to the Indians
Thomas was dealt along with Jamie Easterly and Ernie Camacho from the Brewers to the Cleveland Indians for Rick Manning and Rick Waits on June 6, 1983. Thomas's play had declined late in the 1982 season; he hit .181 after September 1, and he had only four hits in more than 40 at bats in the 1982 postseason. After the announcement of the trade, angry Brewers fans flooded the team's switchboard with phone calls criticizing the transaction. 

After the 1983 season, Thomas expressed his desire for another trade, saying that he did not feel comfortable playing in Cleveland. Thomas had hit more home runs during the period from 1978 to 1983 than any other player in the AL (197).

Later career
Traded to the Seattle Mariners for the 1984 season, Thomas played in only 35 games for the team that year before he underwent season-ending rotator cuff surgery in June. In spring training before the 1985 season, Thomas had some difficulty with the timing of his swing, but he was able to swing without pain and he was looking forward to assuming Seattle's designated hitter role. Thomas was selected as The Sporting News AL Comeback Player of the Year in 1985, as he became the first player in Mariners history to hit 30 home runs in a season. However, Thomas began to feel alienated from his teammates. At a team tenth anniversary party, Thomas was left out of a 1985 Mariners highlight video. Mariners executives said they tried to trade him away but that there was minimal interest in Thomas because of his age and his limitation to the designated hitter role.

After Dick Williams took over as the manager in Seattle toward the beginning of the 1986 season, Thomas saw decreased playing time. By late June, he was hitting .192 with 10 home runs and 26 RBI, and the team decided to release him. Thomas was making $650,000 that season and Mariners owner George Argyros had to absorb the loss of $361,000 that was still owed to Thomas under that contract. Thomas contemplated retirement, and he turned down a contract offer from the Detroit Tigers, but he signed with the Brewers a couple of weeks later to fill a designated hitter and pinch hitter role.

Thomas retired after the 1986 season. He was a career .225 hitter with 268 home runs and 782 RBI in 1435 games.

Later life
In retirement, Thomas played amateur golf and he spent time hunting and carving duck decoys. In the early 1990s, he collected limited-edition prints and considered opening an art gallery. Thomas works under a personal services contract with the Brewers to make appearances in the community and welcome visitors to Gorman's Grill at American Family Field. He was elected to the Wisconsin Athletic Hall of Fame in 2003.  Since 2015 Thomas has marketed "Stormin' Gorman's B.B.Q. Sauce", a mustard based condiment that can be enjoyed with various meats and vegetables.  It is available at American Family Field, home ballpark of the Milwaukee Brewers, as well as retail establishments in Wisconsin.

See also
 List of Major League Baseball career home run leaders
 List of Major League Baseball annual home run leaders

References

External links

Gorman Thomas at Baseballbiography.com

1950 births
Living people
Cleveland Indians players
Milwaukee Brewers players
Seattle Mariners players
Sacramento Solons players
Evansville Triplets players
Danville Warriors players
Clinton Pilots players
Billings Mustangs players
San Antonio Brewers players
Spokane Indians players
American League All-Stars
American League home run champions
Major League Baseball center fielders
Major League Baseball designated hitters
Sportspeople from Charleston, South Carolina
Baseball players from Milwaukee
Baseball players from South Carolina